Cheung Chi Doy (or transliterated as Chang Tse Da; born 30 March 1941) is a Hong Kong former professional footballer. Started his career in native Hong Kong, in the British Empire, he also played for English side Blackpool. In international level, he represented Republic of China (aka Taiwan, now Chinese Taipei national team).

Cheung was the first Asian and Hong Kong football player to play in Europe. He began his career in the Hong Kong First Division at 14 years of age.  In 1960, he went to play for English club Blackpool, where he was a teammate of Jimmy Armfield.  He became the first ethnic Chinese player to appear in the top flight of English football. He made two appearances for Blackpool's first team and scored one goal, against Sheffield Wednesday on November 25, 1961. In 1968, he and his brother Cheung Chi Wai joined the Vancouver Royals, playing under Bobby Robson in the North American Soccer League.  While he began the season in Vancouver, he finished it with the St. Louis Stars.  He also played for Tung Wah, Kitchee and Jardine SA in the Hong Kong First Division.

Since the end of Cheung's stint at Blackpool in 1962, he remains the first and, thus far, only Hong Kong-born football player to have ever played for a top-flight European club. He remains one of only two HongKongers to have played professional football in England, along with Dai Wai Tsun who made his debut in 2017.

In the 1963-64 season, he scored a record number of 42 goals playing for Kitchee SC.

Personal life
Cheung Chi Doy's father, Chang King Hai, and brother Cheung Chi Wai were also footballers.

Cheung Chi Doy's son, Nelson Cheung, is an actor and fashion designer.

In 2011 Cheung Chi Doy was arrested for shoplifting in a supermarket. He was fined HK$2,000 by the court.

References

External links
 NASL statistics
 "Pool Pioneers of the Orient" - Blackpool Gazette, 26 February 2008
 

1941 births
Sing Tao SC players
Hong Kong footballers
Blackpool F.C. players
Kitchee SC players
Hong Kong First Division League players
North American Soccer League (1968–1984) players
Vancouver Royals players
St. Louis Stars (soccer) players
Living people
Hong Kong expatriate footballers
Expatriate footballers in England
Hong Kong expatriates in Canada
Expatriate soccer players in Canada
Hong Kong expatriates in the United States
Expatriate soccer players in the United States
Happy Valley AA players
Kitchee SC managers
Chinese Taipei international footballers
Chinese Taipei international footballers from Hong Kong
Taiwanese footballers
Footballers at the 1960 Summer Olympics
Olympic footballers of Taiwan
Association football forwards
Hong Kong football managers